Kain-Yelga (Qayınyılğa) is a rural locality (a village) in Subkhankulovsky Selsoviet, Tuymazinsky District, Bashkortostan, Russia. The population was 119 as of 2010. There are 10 streets.

Geography 
Kain-Yelga is located 12 km southeast of Tuymazy (the district's administrative centre) by road. Zigityak is the nearest rural locality.

References 

Rural localities in Tuymazinsky District